Frank A. Ehmann is an American former basketball player known for his All-American college career at Northwestern University.

Ehmann joined Northwestern from nearby St. George High School in Evanston, Illinois. He was able to play for the Wildcats as a freshman due to a temporary relaxation of NCAA eligibility rules due to the Korean War. He made the most of his opportunity, earning a starting role that he would hold for four varsity seasons. After two solid years, Ehmann became a primary scorer for the Wildcats as a junior in the 1953–54 season. He averaged 18.2 points per game and at the end of the season was named second-team All-Big Ten Conference and Northwestern's most valuable player for the season.

As a senior, Ehmann spent the year in contention for the Big Ten scoring title as he upped his average to 23.9 points per game. He was recognized as a first-team All-Big Ten performer and earned a spot on Look Magazine's 10-man All-American team. Ehmann left Northwestern as the school's all-time leading scorer for a career (1,291), season (501 his senior year) and single-game (38) – all since broken.

Following the close of his college career, Ehmann toured with a college All-Star team in a series of exhibition games against the Harlem Globetrotters. In the 1955 NBA draft, he was selected by the Syracuse Nationals in the fourth round, but never played in the league. Instead he joined the United States Navy and played amateur basketball on service teams. After his military service, Ehmann entered a career in business in the Chicago area. He once contemplated a return to the business side of basketball in 1989 as a candidate for commissioner of the Continental Basketball Association (CBA), though he ultimately withdrew his name from consideration.

References

External links
College stats @ sports-reference.com
Northwestern Wildcats bio

Date of birth missing (living people)
Living people
All-American college men's basketball players
American men's basketball players
Basketball players from Chicago
Forwards (basketball)
Northwestern Wildcats men's basketball players
Syracuse Nationals draft picks
Year of birth missing (living people)